Motueka Aerodrome  is the airport serving Motueka, New Zealand, and is owned and managed by Tasman District Council.

The current runway is 729 metres long and 11 metres wide with an asphalt surface. This is an adequate length to operate Piper Navajo aircraft. The aerodrome has no control tower, but hangars and refuelling facilities are available.

The following companies operate from Motueka Aerodrome:
 Blue Sky Microlight
 Motueka Aero Club
 Nelson Aviation College
 Skydive Abel Tasman
 Nelson Tasman Air

The runway at Motueka Aerdrome is often used by the Nelson Drag Racing Association for drag racing events. In 1984, Motueka Air started scheduled passenger flights from Motueka to Wellington, New Zealand using a Piper Aztec aircraft. Within a couple of years, the Motueka Air network had grown to include Nelson, Wellington and Palmerston North using additional Piper Chieftains. In 1988, Motueka Air was renamed Air Nelson and relocated to Nelson Airport.

Airlines and destinations

Notes

External links
 Tasman District Council Motueka Aerodrome
 Motueka Aerodrome Management Plan
 Top of the South Aviation Motueka Aerodrome

Airports in New Zealand
Geography of the Tasman District
Motueka
Transport in the Tasman District
Transport buildings and structures in the Tasman District